Rézistans Égalité 974 (RÉ974) is a political party on Réunion. It was founded in 2016 and is allied with La France Insoumise. Jean-Hugues Ratenon sits as the party's only Member of Parliament in the National Assembly of France.

Electoral record

References 

Political parties in Réunion
La France Insoumise
Political parties of the French Fifth Republic
Political parties established in 2016
2016 establishments in France